Nick Nanton is an American director and producer of film and television projects, author, and branding agency executive. He is the co-founder and CEO of DNA Films, through which he has produced and directed a number of documentary films, including Dickie V, Operation Toussaint, Rudy Ruettiger: The Walk On, Visioneer, and A New Leash on Life: The K9s for Warriors Story. He is also the CEO of the Dicks + Nanton Agency, a celebrity branding agency that he co-founded with his business partner J.W. Dicks in Winter Park, Florida. Additionally, Nanton is the creator and host of the Amazon Prime Video interview series, In Case You Didn't Know with Nick Nanton. He has won over 20 Emmy Awards for his work on these projects. Nanton has also written a number of books including Celebrity Branding You and Story Selling. Nanton started his career as an entertainment lawyer.

Early life and education 

Nanton was born in Barbados and immigrated to the United States with his family when he was one year old. His father opened a furniture store in the Orlando area in central Florida, where Nanton largely grew up. His first job was as a tennis instructor when he was 12 years old. He attended Lake Mary High School in Lake Mary, Florida, where he played on the school's tennis team. He graduated from high school in 1998. In his late teens, Nanton became interested in songwriting and music production. By the time he was a college student at the University of Florida, he had his own recording studio (inside a friend's studio) in Gainesville where he was able to work with acts such as Stan Lynch and Sister Hazel. He also made music of his own. Nanton was a member of the Sigma Phi Epsilon fraternity while at college. He graduated from the University of Florida in 2001 with a Bachelor of Science in Business Administration (BSBA) in finance. He went on to earn his J.D. from the University of Florida's Fredric G. Levin College of Law in December 2004.

Career 

Early in his career, Nanton was CEO of the Cinemark Music Group. He also formed his own law firm, Dicks & Nanton, with his legal and business partner J.W. Dicks. The firm primarily focused on liability, trademark, and entertainment law. In July 2007, Nanton was elected to serve on the executive council of The Florida Bar Entertainment, Arts and Sports Law Committee. That year, he was also voted "Best of the Bar 2007" by his peers as published by the Orlando Business Journal, and he became a member of the National Academy of Recording Arts and Sciences with a vote in the Grammy Awards.

Also in 2007, Nanton opted to focus on celebrity marketing, consulting, and public relations. With J.W. Dicks, he formed the Dicks and Nanton Celebrity Branding Agency in Winter Park, Florida in July 2007. Nanton also began serving as the agency's CEO at that time. In 2008, he co-wrote (with Dicks) his first book, Celebrity Branding You. The following year, he began contributing content to compilation books starting with Big Ideas for Your Business.

In 2010, the Dicks Nanton Agency branched into documentary film production. Nanton produced and co-directed the documentary short, Jacob's Turn. Nanton was honored with the award in the Director (Post-Production) category at the 47th Ohio Valley Emmy Awards that year. In the following years, Nanton continued producing and directing films. Films were produced as part of the CelebrityFilms production company started by Dicks and Nanton. That company would later start a new division known as DNA Films.

Nanton continued authoring and contributing to books. In 2013, he published Story Selling which appeared on The Wall Street Journal Best Seller list. With J.W. Dicks, he founded a publishing company called CelebrityPress, which primarily publishes books on the topics of business and entrepreneurship. 2013 also saw Nanton receive further accolades for his film work. He won multiple Suncoast Regional Emmy Awards that year for producing and directing the documentary shorts, Esperanza and Mi Casa Hogar. In 2014, it was announced that Nanton would direct a biographical documentary about the founder of the X Prize Foundation, Peter Diamandis. The resultant film, Visioneer, garnered Nanton another Suncoast Regional Emmy Award in the Director (Post-Production) category in 2015.

In the following years, Nanton produced and directed a number of other biographical documentaries, including Maximum Achievement: The Brian Tracy Story (2017), The Soul of Success: The Jack Canfield Story (2017), Rudy Ruettiger: The Walk On (2018), and Game Changer: The Dan Sullivan Story (2018), among others. In 2018, he won six Suncoast Regional Emmy Awards for producing and directing Rudy Ruettiger, Game Changer, and A New Leash on Life: The K9s for Warriors Story. The Ruettiger film was adapted into a one-man show called Dream Big: Rudy Ruettiger Live on Broadway that was produced and directed by Nanton and staged at the Samuel J. Friedman Theatre on Broadway in 2019.

Also in 2018, Nanton's Prime Video interview series, In Case You Didn't Know with Nick Nanton, premiered and has since featured guests such as Larry King, Dean Kamen, and Anthony Scaramucci. That year, Nanton also directed the documentary, Operation Toussaint, which chronicled the efforts of Operation Underground Railroad (O.U.R.) to retrieve child trafficking victims in Haiti. A 2019 follow-up to that film, Triple Take, followed the eponymous Operation Triple Take undertaken by O.U.R. in Colombia. He also won for From Shelter to Service: A K9s for Warriors Story. In 2020, two episodes ("Nido Qubein: Extraordinary is a Choice" and "Lisa Nichols: Born to Win") from his Prime Video series won Emmy Awards as individual documentaries. He also directed the documentary, Folds of Honor, that year which details the charitable efforts of the non-profit organization of the same name. In 2022 he was honored with a star on the Las Vegas Walk of Stars. Later that year he directed the film Dickie V, covering the life and career of Dick Vitale, which premiered on ESPN+.

Filmography

Bibliography

Nominations and awards

References

External links
Official website
Dicks Nanton Celebrity Branding Agency
DNA Films
All Music Link for Nick Nanton

Year of birth missing (living people)
Living people
American lawyers
Regional Emmy Award winners